The Bleriot XXVII was a middle-wing, single-seat racing aircraft designed by Louis Bleriot.

Specifications

References

Single-engined tractor aircraft
Racing aircraft
Rotary-engined aircraft
Blériot aircraft
Aircraft first flown in 1911